Anwar Sagar (30 August 1949 – 3 June 2020) was an Indian Hindustani poet and lyricist. He penned hundreds of songs in Bollywood films and churned put numerous hit songs such as "Waada Raha Sanam", "Yeh Dua Hai Mere Rab Se", "Dil Ka Kya Kasoor", "Dil Hai Ke Manta Nahin", "Mera Piya Ghar Aaya", "Rahon Mein Unse" etc. He has written 225 songs in 86 Hindi films. He was nominated for Filmfare Award for Best Lyrics in 1992 for the title track of Dil Hai Ke Manta Nahin. His is most remembered for songs in Dil Hai Ke Manta Nahin (1991), Khiladi (1992), Baazigar (1993), Main Khiladi Tu Anari (1994), Yaarana (1995) etc.

Career
Anwar got his first break in the film Zakhmi Rooh (1982). Initially, he had to struggle for more than a decade to finally set an identity with the success of the song "Waada Raha Sanam", sung by Alka Yagnik and Abhijeet Bhattacharya in the film Khiladi (1992). After this success, he penned several hit tracks in the films Dil Ka Kya Kasoor (1992), Sapne Sajan Ke (1992) Vijaypath (1994), Yaarana (1995), Kitne Door Kitne Paas (2002), the latter was his last work in Bollywood.

Death
He died at Kokilaben Dhirubhai Ambani Hospital, Mumbai at the age of 70.

Awards and nominations

Filmography

References

External links 
 

Indian male poets
Urdu-language poets from India
Indian lyricists
Hindi-language lyricists
Indian male songwriters
Indian Muslims
2020 deaths
1949 births
20th-century Indian poets
Poets from Uttar Pradesh
20th-century Indian male writers